Szarvas (Hungarian for deer) may refer to:

Places:

Szarvas, town in Hungary
Szarvasgede, village in Hungary
Szarvaskend, village in Hungary
Sarvaš, village in Croatia

People:
Alexandra Szarvas (1992), Hungarian football striker
Patricia Szarvas (1970), Austrian freelance moderator

Other uses:
Szarvas inscription